A broadcast translator is a low-powered (maximum of 250 watts) FM radio station that retransmits the programming of a parent station that operates on a different frequency. Translators are not allowed to originate programming, and were originally designed to extend the coverage area of a primary analog FM station. In some cases a single station has multiple translators covering various geographical areas. Call signs for translators start with a "K" in the western United States, and a "W" in the east, followed by the three-digit FM channel number assigned to its operating frequency, and closing with two sequentially assigned letters.

The original rules established for translator stations by the Federal Communications Commission have been expanded to allow AM stations to operate FM translators, most commonly to expand nighttime service for stations with very low nighttime powers or which are limited to only broadcasting during daylight hours. The development of HD Radio digital sub-channels for FM stations led to a second expanded use for translators. Due to a lack of commercial receivers capable of receiving HD transmissions, a translator is now permitted to retransmit the programming of an FM station's secondary ("HD2") or tertiary ("HD3") signals. And unlike the original FM translators, an HD-relaying translator normally provides coverage for the same area as the HD transmission, and it is common for both the originating HD transmitter and its translator to be located on the same transmitting tower.

Because of the lack of HD receivers, few listeners listen to the nominally "primary" HD transmission, with the large majority of the audience actually listening via the translator's signal. This is the list of FM broadcast translators used as primary stations in the U.S. in this manner, where the programming emphasizes the translator's signal, and makes little mention of the "parent" HD signal.

References

FM broadcast translators used as primary stations